The Payen PA-22 was a French experimental aircraft designed by Nicolas Roland Payen.

The aircraft had an unconventional design: it had a set of delta wings, in front of which were a set of short conventional wings. It had a fixed front landing gear and the cockpit was further back than usual.

Design and development
In 1935 the prolific aircraft designer Roland Payen developed a radical tandem-wing configuration aircraft which he dubbed the "Fléchair" (Arrow). The PA 22/1R was to be powered by an early form of ramjet known as the Melot 1R engine. This design was to participate in the 1939 Coupe Deutsch de la Meurthe air race. Unfortunately the Melot engine was not able to develop the required thrust and the 1939 Coupe Deutsch de la Meurthe was cancelled due to the start of World War II.

Payen redesigned the aircraft around a Regnier 180 hp 6B-01 six-cylinder, air-cooled inverted in-line engine, which was designated PA 22/2, and was completed in 1939. During its testing in the wind tunnel at Chalais-Meudon (Paris), the Germans invaded France and confiscated it. The German occupation forces were intrigued by the design and completed the wind tunnel testing. Redesignated the PA 22 V5, painted in German colors and coded BI+XB, the aircraft was transferred to Villacoublay. In October 1942 Payen's test pilot Jacques Charpantier, completed the first flight. A flight test program was started, but before it was completed Payen convinced the German authorities that modifications were necessary and had the prototype returned to his factory at Juvisy.

Improvements including a variable-pitch propeller and supplementary fuel tanks were started but in 1943 an Allied air raid on the Juvisy railway yard also struck the factory, destroying the PA 22.

Specifications

See also
Payen Pa 49

References

Bibliography
 

PA22
1940s French experimental aircraft
Single-engined tractor aircraft
Tandem-wing aircraft
Delta-wing aircraft